Nestea is a Swiss brand of iced tea and pop beverages owned by Nestlé, manufactured by The Coca-Cola Company and distributed by Nestlé's beverage department in the United States and by Beverage Partners Worldwide (BPW), a joint venture between The Coca-Cola Company and Nestlé, in the rest of the world. It competes with Unilever/PepsiCo's Lipton Iced Tea and Fuze Tea. Nestea provides a variety of tea products, including liquid and powdered tea concentrates, refrigeratable teas, and ready-to-drink bottles dispensed by vendor or vending machine.  The beverage comes in several flavors, depending on the country.

Since the start of 2017, Nestlé and Coca-Cola agreed to end the iced tea Nestea joint venture after 16 years of collaboration. One of the reasons for this, is that Coca-Cola and Nestlé want to pursue different strategies in a rapidly changing market. Nestlé will handle the distribution of Nestea in most countries except in Canada, Spain, Portugal, Romania, Andorra, Bulgaria and Serbia where Coca-Cola will retain a license.

In 2019, Nestea rebranded as a natural product. The new recipe, launched by Nestlé after the end of the joint venture, does not contain artificial colors and flavors, corn syrup and no GMO ingredients anymore. In addition, Nestea ready-to-drink iced tea is made with stevia extract and can be found in different flavors such as lemon, raspberry and peach. The new recipe sources its tea leaves from Nilgiri, a region in India.

See also

 Lipton
 Nestea Beach Volleyball
 NesTea

References

Iced tea brands
Nestlé brands
Coca-Cola brands
Non-alcoholic drinks